Xanthan gum is a polysaccharide with many industrial uses, including as a common food additive. It is an effective thickening agent, emulsifier, and stabilizer that prevents ingredients from separating. It can be produced from simple sugars using a fermentation process and derives its name from the species of bacteria used, Xanthomonas campestris.

History
Xanthan gum was discovered by Allene Rosalind Jeanes and her research team at the United States Department of Agriculture, and brought into commercial production by CP Kelco under the trade name Kelzan in the early 1960s. It was approved for use in foods in 1968 and is accepted as a safe food additive in the USA, Canada, European countries, and many other countries, with E number E415, and CAS number 11138-66-2.

Xanthan gum derives its name from the species of bacteria used during the fermentation process, Xanthomonas campestris.

Uses
Xanthan gum, 1%, can produce a significant increase in the viscosity of a liquid.

In foods, xanthan gum is common in salad dressings and sauces.  It helps to prevent oil separation by stabilizing the emulsion, although it is not an emulsifier.  Xanthan gum also helps suspend solid particles, such as spices. Xanthan gum helps create the desired texture in many ice creams. Toothpaste often contains xanthan gum as a binder to keep the product uniform. Xanthan gum also helps thicken commercial egg substitutes made from egg whites, to replace the fat and emulsifiers found in yolks. It is also a preferred method of thickening liquids for those with swallowing disorders, since it does not change the color or flavor of foods or beverages at typical use levels. In gluten-free baking, xanthan gum is used to give the dough or batter the stickiness that would otherwise be achieved with gluten. In most foods it is used at concentrations of 0.5% or less. Xanthan gum is used in a wide range of food products, such as sauces, dressings, meat and poultry products, bakery products, confectionery products, beverages, dairy products, others.

In the oil industry, xanthan gum is used in large quantities to thicken drilling mud. These fluids carry the solids cut by the drilling bit to the surface. Xanthan gum provides great "low end" rheology.  When circulation stops, the solids remain suspended in the drilling fluid.  The widespread use of horizontal drilling and the demand for good control of drilled solids has led to its expanded use. It has been added to concrete poured underwater, to increase its viscosity and prevent washout.

In cosmetics, xanthan gum is used to prepare water gels. It is also used in oil-in-water emulsions to enhance droplet coalescence. Xanthan gum is under preliminary research for its potential uses in tissue engineering to construct hydrogels and scaffolds supporting three-dimensional tissue formation.

Shear thinning
The viscosity of xanthan gum solutions decreases with higher shear rates. This is called shear thinning or pseudoplasticity.  This means that a product subjected to shear, whether from mixing, shaking or chewing will thin. When the shear forces are removed, the food will thicken again. In salad dressing, the addition of xanthan gum makes it thick enough at rest in the bottle to keep the mixture fairly homogeneous, but the shear forces generated by shaking and pouring thins it, so it can be easily poured. When it exits the bottle, the shear forces are removed and it thickens again, so it clings to the salad.

Amounts used 
The greater the ratio of xanthan gum added to a liquid, the thicker the liquid will become. An emulsion can be formed with as little as 0.1% (by weight). Increasing the amount of gum gives a thicker, more stable emulsion up to 1% xanthan gum. A teaspoon of xanthan gum weighs about 2.5 grams and brings one cup (250ml) of water to a 1% concentration.

To make a foam, 0.2–0.8% xanthan gum is typically used. Larger amounts result in larger bubbles and denser foam. Egg white powder (0.2–2.0%) with 0.1–0.4% xanthan gum yields bubbles similar to soap bubbles.

Health

Xanthan gum may have some health benefits.  It has slowed tumor growth in mice with skin cancer, stabilized blood sugar, lowered cholesterol  and improved the symptoms of dysphagia.  Xanthan gum may also act as a laxative.

Safety
According to a 2017 safety review by a scientific panel of the European Food Safety Authority (EFSA), xanthan gum (European food additive number E 415) is extensively digested during intestinal fermentation, and causes no adverse effects, even at high intake amounts. The EFSA panel found no concern about genotoxicity from long-term consumption. The EFSA concluded that there is no safety concern for the general population when xanthan gum is consumed as a food additive.

Processing by microbiome
In 2022, scientists found that a microbe from the family Ruminococcaceae was present in human stool samples, was capable of degrading xanthan gum, and appeared to be from the microbiome of people in industrialized countries.

Preparation
Xanthan gum is produced by the fermentation of glucose and sucrose. The medium is well-aerated and stirred, and the xanthan polymer is produced extracellularly into the medium. After one to four days, the polymer is precipitated from the medium by the addition of isopropyl alcohol, and the precipitate is dried and milled to give a powder that is readily soluble in water or brine.

It is composed of pentasaccharide repeat units, comprising glucose, mannose, and glucuronic acid in the molar ratio 2:2:1.

A strain of X. campestris has been developed that will grow on lactose - which allows it to be used to process whey, a waste product of cheese production. This can produce 30 g/L of xanthan gum for every 40 g/L of whey powder. Whey-derived xanthan gum is commonly used in many commercial products, such as shampoos and salad dressings.

Detail of the biosynthesis
Synthesis originates from glucose as substrate for synthesis of the sugar nucleotides precursors UDP-glucose, UDP-glucuronate, and GDP-mannose that are required for building the pentasaccharide repeat unit. This links the synthesis of xanthan to carbohydrate metabolism. The repeat units are built up at undecaprenylphosphate lipid carriers that are anchored in the cytoplasmic membrane.

Specific glycosyltransferases sequentially transfer the sugar moieties of the nucleotide sugar xanthan precursors to the lipid carriers. Acetyl and pyruvyl residues are added as non-carbohydrate decorations. Mature repeat units are polymerized and exported in a way resembling the Wzy-dependent polysaccharide synthesis mechanism of Enterobacteriaceae. Products of the gum gene cluster drive synthesis, polymerization, and export of the repeat unit.

References

Edible thickening agents
Food additives
Natural gums
Polysaccharides
E-number additives